Esophageal (Oesophageal in British English) arteries are a group of arteries from disparate sources supplying the esophagus. The blood supply to the esophagus can roughly be divided into thirds, with anastamoses between each area of supply.

More specifically, it can refer to:
 Esophageal branches of inferior thyroid artery (top third)
 Esophageal branches of thoracic part of aorta (middle third)
 Esophageal branches of left gastric artery (bottom third)

Arteries